First State Bank may refer to any one of several state bank systems or to several specific buildings, to which First State Bank Building may also refer:

Bank systems in the United States

First State Bank (Nebraska), a five branch bank system in Nebraska

Bank buildings in the United States (and/or bank systems)
(by state)
First State Bank of Manlius, Manlius, Illinois, listed on the NRHP in Illinois
First State Bank (Edna, Kansas), listed on the NRHP in Kansas
Mitchell Building-First State Bank Building, Barbourville, Kentucky, listed on the NRHP in Kentucky
First State Bank of LeRoy, LeRoy, Minnesota, listed on the NRHP in Minnesota
First State Bank (St. Joseph, Minnesota), listed on the NRHP in Minnesota
First State Bank, Dowling and Emhoff Buildings, Stevensville, Montana, listed on the NRHP in Montana
First State Bank of Chester, Chester, Montana, listed on the NRHP in Montana
First State Bank of Bethany, Lincoln, Nebraska, listed on the NRHP in Nebraska
First State Bank of Buxton, Buxton, North Dakota, listed on the NRHP in North Dakota
First State Bank of Indiahoma, Indiahoma, Oklahoma, listed on the NRHP in Oklahoma
First State Bank of Maramec, Maramec, Oklahoma, listed on the NRHP in Oklahoma
First State Bank (Shattuck, Oklahoma), listed on the NRHP in Oklahoma
First State Bank of Hazel, Hazel, South Dakota, listed on the NRHP in South Dakota
First State Bank Building (Revillo, South Dakota), listed on the NRHP in South Dakota
First State Bank and Trust Building (Bryan, Texas), listed on the NRHP in Texas
First State Bank of Baggs, Baggs, Wyoming, listed on the NRHP in Wyoming